The Buddenbrooks (German: Die Buddenbrooks) is a television series which originally aired on ARD in 1979. Based on the 1901 novel Buddenbrooks by Thomas Mann, it was made as a co-production between France and West Germany.

Selected cast
 Ursula Dirichs as Ida Jungmann
 Reinhild Solf as Tony
 Volkert Kraeft as Thomas
 Gerd Böckmann as Christian
 Ruth Leuwerik as Konsulin
 Udo Thomer as Marcus, Prokurist
 Noëlle Châtelet as Gerda
  as Hanno Buddenbrook
 Barbara Markus as Erika Grünlich
 Alexander Hegarth as Dr. Grabow
 Regine Lutz as Sesemi Weichbrodt
  as Mlle. Popinet
 Martin Benrath as Konsul Buddenbrook
 Carl Raddatz as Johann Buddenbrook sen.
 Katharina Brauren as Antoinette Buddenbrook
 Michael Degen as Bendix Grünlich

References

Bibliography
 Horst Kliemann. Who's Who in Germany. Intercontinental, 1996.

External links
 

1979 German television series debuts
1979 German television series endings
1970s drama television series
German-language television shows
Films based on works by Thomas Mann